Hinkle or Hinkles or Hinckle may refer to:

People with the surname
 Branden Lee Hinkle, American mixed martial arts fighter
 Bryan Hinkle, American football player
 Carl Hinkle, American football player
 Clarke Hinkle, American football player
 George M. Hinkle, American leader in the Latter Day Saint movement
 Gordie Hinkle, American baseball player
 James F. Hinkle, New Mexico Governor, 1923-1925
 Jason Hinkle, American musician
 Jedediah Hinkle, American politician
 Kathy Hinkle, American politician
 Lon Hinkle, American golfer
 Marin Hinkle, American actress
 Phillip Hinkle, American politician
 Robert Lewis Hinkle, U.S. federal judge
 Tony Hinkle, American basketball coach
 Warren Hinckle, American political journalist

Fictional
 Adenoid Hynkel, fictional fascist leader, played by Charlie Chaplin in The Great Dictator
 Eric Hinkle, fictional character
 Professor Hinkle, a bumbling  magician from Frosty the Snowman
 Paul Hinkle, a character on the Canadian TV show Caillou

Places
 Clarke Hinkle Field, football practice facility
 Hinkle Fieldhouse, basketball arena
 Hinkles, Georgia
 Hinkle, Kentucky
 Hinkle, Oregon, unincorporated community
 Hinkle Locomotive Service and Repair Facility, locomotive shop in Hinkle
 Hinkle-Murphy House, historical building

Other
 18948 Hinkle, asteroid